Chondrodactylus bibronii, commonly known as Bibron's thick-toed gecko, Bibron's sand gecko, or simply Bibron's gecko, is a species of lizard in the family Gekkonidae. The species is native to southern Africa. C. bibronii has been used as an animal model in bioastronautic research examining the effects of spaceflight on the morphology and physiology of vertebrates.

Etymology
The specific name, bibronii, is in honor of French herpetologist Gabriel Bibron, as are several common names.

Geographic range
Bibron's gecko is distributed across the southern part of the African continent in Namibia, South Africa, and Eswatini. It is common in South Africa, where it is one of the largest gecko species.

C. bibronii has been introduced in the southeastern United States. Populations have been found in Manatee County, Florida.

Description
It has a stockier build than most other geckos. The female is generally smaller than the male. Its base color is brown, and it has a beaded pattern dorsally, with black crossbars. The male has white dots; the female may, as well. The belly is white or very light brown. The newly hatched Bibron's gecko has solid line and color patterns, while the adult's patterns are more broken.

Behavior
Bibron's thick-toed gecko is arboreal and ground-dwelling. It is territorial, and males are very aggressive toward each other. Individuals can commonly be found missing appendages in the wild.

Reproduction
An adult female C. bibronii usually lays two clutches per year, with two eggs per clutch.

References

Further reading
Boulenger GA (1885). Catalogue of the Lizards in the British Museum (Natural History). Second Edition. Volume I. Geckonidæ, ... London: Trustees of the British Museum (Natural History). (Taylor and Francis, printers). xii + 436 pp. + Plates I-XXXII. (Pachydactylus bibronii, pp. 201–202).
Branch WR, Bauer AM (2005). The Herpetological Contributions of Sir Andrew Smith. Society for the Study of Amphibians and Reptiles (SSAR). 80 pp. .
Branch, Bill (2004). Field Guide to Snakes and other Reptiles of Southern Africa. Third Revised edition, Second impression. Sanibel Island Florida: Ralph Curtis Books. 399 pp. . (Pachydactylus bibronii, pp. 251–252 + Plate 84).
Smith A (1846). Illustrations of the Zoology of South Africa ... Reptiles. London: Smith, Elder and Co. (Tarentola bibronii, new species, Plate 1, Figure 1).

External links

Chondrodactylus
Geckos of Africa
Reptiles of Eswatini
Reptiles of Mozambique
Reptiles of Namibia
Reptiles of South Africa
Reptiles described in 1846
Taxa named by Andrew Smith (zoologist)